Kouassi Franck Olivier Brou (born 16 June 1992 in Agnibilékrou, Côte d'Ivoire) is an Ivorian swimmer specializing in freestyle. He competed in the men's 50 m event at the 2012 Summer Olympics.

References 

1992 births
Living people
Ivorian male freestyle swimmers
Swimmers at the 2012 Summer Olympics
Olympic swimmers of Ivory Coast
People from Comoé District
20th-century Ivorian people
21st-century Ivorian people